Lists of Czech actors are split by gender.

 List of Czech actresses
 List of Czech male actors

Czech